Owen Earle Kahn (June 15, 1903 - January 17, 1981) was a Major League Baseball player.

Prior to the 1930 season, Kahn was purchased by the Braves from the Manchester Blue Sox of the New England League. At that point in his career, Kahn was primarily a third baseman, but he never played a fielding position in the majors.

Kahn made his only major league appearance on May 24, when he pinch-ran for George Sisler in a game against the Brooklyn Robins. After scoring, he was replaced in the field by Billy Rhiel. On June 9, Kahn's contract was sold to the Pittsfield Hillies of the Eastern League. He continued to play in the minors until , ending his career with the Wilmington Pirates.

Notes

Sources

Boston Braves players
Durham Bulls players
Los Angeles Angels (minor league) players
Marshalltown Ansons players
Norfolk Tars players
Pittsfield Hillies players
Providence Grays (minor league) players
Reading Keystones players
Wilmington Pirates players
William & Mary Tribe baseball players
Baseball players from Richmond, Virginia
1903 births
1981 deaths